Octavie Tardif, born Boulongne on (- )  in Aumale, was a communist activist and member of the International Workers' Association (International), working as a dressmaker in Paris. She was involved in the actions undertaken by women in the Paris Commune, becoming in particular one of the leaders of the Union des femmes pour la défense de Paris et les soins aux blessés created by Elisabeth Dmitrieff and Nathalie Lemel.

Biography

Family 
Octavie Victoire Boulongne was born in 1833 in Aumale, daughter and her parents were Pierre Antoine Prudence Boulogne, tailor, and Virginie Leclerc.

In December 1861, having become a tailor herself and living with Martial Tardif, also a tailor, at 18 Boulevard d'Italie in Paris, she gave birth to a boy named Marcelin, the natural son of her partner. The child died eight months later.

In February 1863, Octavie Boulongne and Martial Tardif got married, while she was pregnant : their daughter Henriette was born in August. Four years later, their son Octave was born, but he died four months in Subligny, Cher, where he had been placed with a nurse.

Martial Tardif died in 1875.

Activism for women's rights to work 
In October 1870, Octavie Tardif, along with four other citizens, submitted a complaint to the Paris City Hall, asking that : able-bodied men who are not physicians or surgeons [be] replaced by women in the ambulance serviceTheir request was accepted.

As one of the leaders of the 13th arrondissement of the Union of Women for the Defense of Paris and the Care of the Wounded, founded on April 11, 1871, Octavie Tardif wrote a collective letter for the women workers addressed to Léo Frankel acting as a "delegate to the writings". The letter was signed by ten representatives of the women workers of Paris. In this letter, the women state that they were still waiting for a useful job and criticized the fact that the administration of the Commune was primarily concerned with politics. They expressed the opinion that the eradication of misery should be a priority and that politics would be "pure" when the economic question was settled, that is, brought by the emancipation of work, by eliminating the intermediaries and usurers between producers and final consumption of the product of their work. They opposed a feminine vision of "progress" and the “immobilism of your sex“.

On May 3, 1871, Octavie Tardif addressed a petition with 85 signatures to the Commission du travail et d'échange: We need work, since our brothers, our husbands, our sons cannot provide for the family.She was the secretary of the Pantheon of the International and, according to a police report of January 14, 1873, had sent the list of members of the International in the 13th arrondissement of Paris to the Military Justice.

Octavie Boulongne, lived at 11 rue du Moulin-des-Prés, died on October 25,  1917 at the Hôpital Cochin.  On her death certificate, it is written that she was the widow of a man named Berney, and  “no other informations“.

References

Bibliography 
 

Communards
French anarchists
Members of the International Workingmen's Association
1833 births
People from Seine-Maritime
1917 deaths
19th-century French women politicians